Lophocampa flavodorsata is a moth in the family Erebidae. It was described by Vincent & Laguerre in 2013. It is found in Venezuela (Aragua, Lara, Mérida), Ecuador (Napo, Morona-Santiago, Sucumbios) and Peru (Cuzco, Huanuco).

Description
The forewings are brown irrorated with light and dark brown. There is one yellow spot with two small black dots at the base and a series of bands formed by white spots arranged as follows: the antemedial band is broken, the medial band is slightly curved and the postmedial band is sinuous. The hindwings are yellow-white, slightly tinged with yellow-brown marks on the apex and along the costa, with a yellowtinge along the anal border. Ventrally, the marks are more contrasting, deep brown centered with yellow-brown.

Etymology
The specific epithet flavodorsata refers to the yellowish hairs of the abdominal tergites.

References

Lophocampa flavodorsata at funet
Lophocampa flavodorsata at BOLD Systems

Moths described in 2013
flavodorsata